The National Council of Negro Women, Inc. (NCNW) is a nonprofit organization founded in 1935 with the mission to advance the opportunities and the quality of life for African-American women, their families, and communities. Mary McLeod Bethune, the founder of NCNW, wanted to encourage the participation of Negro women in civic, political, economic and educational activities and institutions. The organization was considered as a cleaning house for the dissemination of activities concerning women but wanted to work alongside a group who supported civil rights rather than go to actual protests. Women on the council fought more towards political and economic successes of black women to uplift them in society. NCNW fulfills this mission through research, advocacy, national and community-based services and programs in the United States and Africa.

NCNW serves as a super organization that acts as a cohesive umbrella for the other African-American groups that already existed. With its 28 national affiliate organizations and its more than 200 community-based sections, NCNW has an outreach to nearly four million women, all contributing to the peaceful solutions of the problems of human welfare and rights. The national headquarters, which acts as a central source for program planning, is based in Washington, D.C., on Pennsylvania Avenue, located between the White House and the U.S. Capitol. NCNW also has two field offices.

History
The National Council of Negro Women, Inc. (NCNW)
The council is indeed a charitable agency that was created in 1935 with the goal of improving the possibilities and standard of living for African-American women, one‘s family, including their community. NCNW was founded by Mary McLeod Bethune, who aimed to empower black women to participate in civil, governmental, economical, as well as academic programs and institutions. The group was viewed as a clearinghouse for the transmission of women's activities, although it preferred to collaborate with a civil rights group instead of participate in real protests. Women on the committee pushed harder for black women's economic and political success in order to elevate them in society. Within the  United States and Africa, NCNW carries out its purpose via study, lobbying, and regional and community-based programs and initiatives.
The NCNW is a super-organization which functions as a unified framework for the various African-American organizations which currently operate. NCNW has a reach of approximately four million women, thanks to its 28 nationwide affiliation groups and far greater than 200 society divisions, all of which contribute to diplomatic solutions to humanitarian security and liberties issues. The national offices is situated on Pennsylvania Avenue, between both the White House and the United States Capitol, in Washington, D.C., and serves as a primary source for planning process. Two field offices are also part of the NCNW.
Mary McLeod Bethune,  a prominent teacher and governmental analyst for whom the forebears had been born in to the slavery, created the NCNW on December 5, 1935. Bethune recognized a need for a national organization to capture the strength of African-American women and expand their leadership. The group was founded a few years after World War I by the National Association of Colored Women (NACW), which recognized a need to defend black female's democratic and financial rights.
Many groups supporting basic liberties of African Americans were created in the 1930s, but few explicitly for African-American women. Mary used the NACW's ideals and founded the NCNW to assist African-American women plus their families. She believed that perhaps the initiatives were unsuccessful in addressing the primary issues which women encountered on a daily basis, and she intended NCNW to have a strong foundation.  The tiny volunteer staff of NCNW functioned outside of Bethune's loungeroom in Washington, D.C. in the early years.   Despite its modest origins, the federal government granted the NCNW, together else the National Association for the Advancement of Colored People (NAACP), observers accreditation to the United Nations when it was established in 1945.(Tuuri , 2018)
The group's initial four decades were devoted to realizing Bethune's vision for a consolidated women's liberation movement competent of solving financial, governmental, and social concerns that impact women and their households. In comparison to an amendment, the NCNW's endorsement was seen as extremely crucial by women's groups. From the mid-1920s until the mid-1960s, black female leaders remained noticeably missing from groups working for female equality, therefore Bethune's and the NCNW's involvement in the field of women's issues was exceptional for the period. The bigotry of white suffragists, whom black women had faced throughout the campaign for the 19th Amendment, was one of the reasons for their inaction in this area.(Higgins 2019 )
Despite the fact that Bethune as well as the NCNW remained heavily engaged in the fight for the Civil Rights Legislation, particularly in the late 1940s, she was cautious to maintain her institution upon that conservative aspect of the debate and declined to endorse it. In 1965, the NCNW enlisted the help of several northern women with backgrounds in cognitive science, community services, and professional training, and also poorly skilled volunteers, to assist its Freedom Schools and also other emerging initiatives then under Office of Economic Opportunity, which the NCNW had fought to establish in Mississippi.
The following are among NCNW's recent overseas activities: Keeping observer membership first at United Nations in order to reflect African-American women's voices, Providing technological, training, microcredit, and economic empowerment projects in Benin in collaboration with national women's groups. Youth from Uganda, North Africa, and the United States are participating in a three-nation  educational exchange. Senegal is developing a small company incubator. In Eritrea, we are collaborating on the establishment of a big microcredit initiative that will provide business loans and coaching to over 500 women.
The National Council of Negro Women organizes its work with partners in 34 states as such an overarching framework for 39 national and regional advocacy organizations for women of African origin in the United States and overseas.

Social contributions 
The NCNW also produced several cookbooks. Their first one, The Historical Cookbook of the American Negro, was published in 1958 and was edited by Sue Bailey Thurman. It took over a decade to produce and fundraise for, and includes research and contributions from African American women across the country. The goal of the cookbook was in line with the goals of the NCNW, which include to further world peace, further integration, and also hold on to and value African American heritage as a unique cultural form. This cookbook is not organized by the genre of the food, but by the calendar year, starting with “Hopping John” for Emancipation Proclamation Day and ending with “Hot Apple Punch” for Christmas. One of its goals was also to include recognition and appreciation for African American heroes and heroines throughout history, such as George Washington Carver, for example, who gets one of his own recipes in the cookbook for "Carver Commemoration Day." Moreover, the idea behind this cookbook was not just the sharing of traditional African American recipes, but the inserting of African American's accomplishments into the mainstream idea of history in the U.S. that consists largely of the recorded the accomplishments of white men. In The Historical Cookbook of the American Negro, Sue Bailey Thurman set out to show how history resides in the social and cultural products of heritage recipes. The NCNW did not produce another cookbook for over thirty years, until the 1990's. In the 1990's, the NCNW came out with The Black Family Reunion Cookbook: Recipes and Food Memories (1991), The Black Family Dinner Quilt Cookbook: Health Conscious Recipes and Food Memories (1993), and Celebrating Our Mothers' Kitchens: Treasured Memories and Tested Recipes (1994). These three cookbooks were dedicated to food itself much more than The Historical Cookbook of the American Negro (1958), but still included more than just recipes. They include oral histories, personal narratives, political commentary, popular culture, food and food customs, and intertwine all with culinary instruction. The recipes are from both old family recipes from African American women around the country, as well as documented historical recipes. Many recipes  in these newer cookbooks start with an opening vignette about a loved family member or a story that ties the food to a special event or place. One of the goals of these cookbooks was to emphasize the potency of food, happy memories with family, and the image of well-fed children in order to contribute to a positive African American collective memory and to resist negative stereotypes about African American women that have circulated in the U.S. since the times of slavery. The NCNW cookbooks work to form a cohesive African American identity surrounding food.

Political standpoint 
Although Bethune and the NCNW were very much involved in the struggle over the Equal Rights Amendment, especially in the late 1940s, even she was careful to keep her organization on the conservative side of the issue and refused to support the amendment. In 1965 the NCNW recruited many northern women with professional backgrounds in such fields as psychology, social work, and education as well as unskilled volunteers to aid the Freedom Schools and other developing programs under the Office of Economic Opportunity which the NCNW had held to establish in Mississippi.

Mary McLeod Bethune 
From 1936 to 1942, Bethune was simultaneously the president of Bethune-Cookman College (founded by her for black students in Daytona, Florida), the first president and founder of the NCNW and the special Roosevelt as Director of the Division of Negro Affairs of the National Youth Administration. Her plans were to plan, initiate, and carry out the dreams of African-American women who felt unheard and mistreated.

Other founders 
When Bethune stepped down from the presidency of the NCNW, in November 1949 at the age of 74, her two successors, Dorothy B. Ferebee, who presided from 1949 to 1953, and Vivian C. Mason, who presided from 1953 to 1957, carried on the tradition of "black first". After 1958, under Dorothy Height's leadership, the NCNW began to move in new directions to come to terms with a number of old problems, and she works to bring the organization up to date with the times. In her first years as president, Height concentrated on achieving concrete goals: the acquisition of tax-exempt status; the erection of the Bethune Memorial Statue; the professionalization of the NCNW; and the establishment of Mary McLeod Bethune Memorial Museum and National Archives for Black Women's History.

Dorothy Height 
Dorothy Height served as the NCNW's fourth president from 1957 to 1997, helping women feel empowered until the day she died. She marched with Martin Luther King at the civil rights marches and was invited to President Obama's inauguration. President Obama also spoke at her funeral along with many other women and men who cared deeply for her. One of Height’s main concerns was with the problems many blacks faced as a result of their poverty. So, she began a campaign in Mississippi that would make better food and shelter available for those at a disadvantage by partnering with the federal government to support Black women with getting houses built for their families. The main project of this campaign was to establish a "pig bank" which would lend pigs to black families and charge interest equal to one pig per family. By 1957 the original "pig banks," of what was 55 had grown to more than 2,000 pigs. Thus, the NCNW aided many poor families in the rural South by helping them to make many practical improvements in their daily lives. This program helped many families out of poverty giving them free meals to live off of.

Archives project 

Mary McLeod Bethune, the founder, worked to get African-American women their own institution that contained records and history of other black women to support the uplift of women's empowerment. She used the NCNW to help create the National Archives of Negro Women's History by establishing a committee specifically to find information about different African-American women so they could feel just as educated.

National and international programs
Some of NCNW's recent programs include:
 The annual Black Family Reunion Program Celebration
 Public education and advocacy for African Americans on Supreme Court and lower court nominees
 Early childhood literacy programs to close the achievement gap
 A new initiative and publication entitled African American Women As We Age, which is intended to educate women on health and finances
 A national obesity abatement initiative
 A partnership with National Aeronautics and Space Administration (NASA) to develop Community Learning Centers targeting traditionally underserved students
 Technical assistance to eight Youth Opportunity Centers in Washington, DC

Some of NCNW's recent international activities include:
 Maintaining consultative status at the United Nations to represent the voice of African-American women
 Partnering with national women's organizations in Benin to deliver technology, literacy, microcredit and economic empowerment programs
 Linking youth in Uganda, north Africa and the U.S. in a three-nation educational exchange.
Developing a small business incubator in Senegal
 Partnering in the implementation of a large microcredit program in Eritrea extending small business loans and training to more than 500 women.

Serving as an umbrella organization for 39 national and local advocacy groups for women of African descent both in the U.S. and abroad, the National Council of Negro Women coordinates its activities with partners in 34 states. The Council also runs four research and policy centers in its efforts to develop best practices in addressing the health, educational, and economic needs of African-American women. In 2007, NCNW's administrative costs were an estimated $4 million of the organization's group's $6 million budget for programs.

National Black Family Reunion
NCNW organizes the National Black Family Reunion, a two-day cultural event celebrating the enduring strengths and traditional values of the African-American fathers.

National chairs of NCNW
 Mary McLeod Bethune (1935–1949)
 Dorothy Boulding Ferebee (1949–1953)
 Vivian Carter Mason (1953–1957)
 Dorothy Height (1957–1997)
 Barbara L. Shaw (2010–2012)
 Ingrid Saunders Jones (2012–2018)
 Johnnetta B. Cole (2018–2022)
 Dr. Thelma T. Daley (2022–2023)

National President & CEO
 Rev. Shavon L. Arline-Bradley (2023–present)

Executive Directors of NCNW
 Alfreda Davis
 Avis Jones-DeWeever (2010–2012)
 Janice L. Mathis (2016–2023)

Uncommon Height Awards
As of 2016:

 2020: Susan Taylor
 2016: Tom Joyner
 2016: Cicely Tyson
 2014: John Lewis
 2014: Valerie Montgomery Rice
 2011: Ingrid Saunders Jones
 2011: Steve Perry
 2011: Earl W. Stafford
 2011: Vanessa Williams
 2009: Oprah Winfrey
 2008: Sidney Poitier
 2007: Dorothy I. Height
 2006: Johnnetta B. Cole
 2006: Ann M. Fudge
 2006: Cathy Hughes
 2005: Nancy Wilson
 2004: Quincy Jones
 2003: Bill and Camille Cosby
 2002: Maya Angelou
 2000: Vernon Jordan
 1999: Marian Wright Edelman
 1998: Dorothy I. Height

See also
 Africana womanism
 List of women's organizations

References

 Tuuri, R. (2018). Strategic Sisterhood: The National Council of Negro Women in the Black Freedom Struggle. UNC Press Books. 
 Higgins, A. L. (2019). "Strategic Sisterhood: The National Council of Negro Women in the Black Freedom Struggle" by Rebecca Tuuri. Journal of Southern History, 85(3), 732–733.

Further reading
 Julie A. Gallagher. "The National Council of Negro Women, Human Rights, and the Cold War," in Laughlin, Kathleen A., and Jacqueline L. Castledine, eds, Breaking the Wave: Women, Their Organizations, and Feminism, 1945–1985 (Routledge, 2011), pp. 80–98

External links
 www.ncnw.org – official website

 
African-American feminism
African Americans' rights organizations
African-American women's organizations
Women's organizations based in the United States
Civil rights movement
1935 establishments in the United States
Organizations established in 1935
Organizations based in Washington, D.C.